Nadimpalli Venkata Lakshmi Narasimha Rao (1 January 1890 - 16 January 1978) (often known as N.V.L.) of Guntur popularly known as "Guntur Kesari" was an Indian freedom fighter who worked in tandem with "Andhra Kesari" Tanguturi Prakasam Pantulu. In 1953 he acted as pro tem speaker of the Andhra Pradesh Legislative Assembly.

Early life and education 
He was born on 1 January 1890 in Guntur to parents Ramaiah and Lakshmamma.

After graduating from Andhra Christian College in Guntur he travelled to England with his childhood friend Duggirala Gopalakrishnayya (Andhra Ratna) where he studied for his M.A. Hons (Economics) at Edinburgh University. He was then called to the bar at Lincoln's Inn.

Career 
In 1915, he enrolled in the Madras High Court.He joined the office as a junior to Tanguturi Prakasam (Andhra Kesari). He was nominated as chairman of Guntur Municipal Council by Shri Motilal Nehru, After he gave a welcome address to the committee led by Motilal Nehru defying the orders of the British Collector.

In 1922, N.V.L Narasimharao was the first person to hoist the Flag of India during British rule when he did so on the Guntur Municipality building.

Salt Satyagraha in Coastal Andhra 

In 1930 he actively participated in the Salt March in Coastal Andhra, led by Mahatma Gandhi. As a Chairman of Municipality he made all employees volunteers to the Salt Satyagraha.

Andhra Legislative Assembly 
In 1953, just after the formation of the state of Andhra Pradesh, when Kurnool was the capital, he was made pro tem speaker of the newly-formed Andhra Pradesh Legislative Assembly.

References 

Speakers of the Andhra Pradesh Legislative Assembly
Alumni of the University of Edinburgh
Members of Lincoln's Inn
People from Guntur
Indian independence activists from Andhra Pradesh
19th-century Indian lawyers
Indian barristers
1890 births
1978 deaths